Al-Hawash is a Syrian village located in the Qalaat al-Madiq Subdistrict of the al-Suqaylabiyah District in Hama Governorate. According to the Syria Central Bureau of Statistics (CBS), al-Hawash had a population of 3,306 in the 2004 census.

References

Populated places in al-Suqaylabiyah District
Populated places in al-Ghab Plain